Jean Bottéro (30 August 1914 – 15 December 2007) was a French historian born in Vallauris. He was a major Assyriologist and a renowned expert on the Ancient Near East. He died in Gif-sur-Yvette.

Biography
He participated with other colleagues committed to the left (Elena Cassin, Maxime Rodinson, Maurice Godelier, Charles Malamoud, André-Georges Haudricourt, Jean-Paul Brisson, Jean Yoyotte) in a Marxist think tank organised by Jean-Pierre Vernant. This group took on an institutional form with the creation, in 1964, of the Centre des recherches comparées sur les sociétés anciennes, which later became the Centre Louis Gernet, focusing more on the study of ancient Greece.

Works
Collab. with Marie-Joseph Stève, Il était une fois la Mésopotamie, collection « Découvertes Gallimard » (nº 191), série Archéologie. Paris: Gallimard, 1993, reprint 2009. .
Babylone : À l'aube de notre culture, collection « Découvertes Gallimard » (nº 230), série Histoire. Paris: Gallimard, 1994. .
Ancestor of the West: Writing, Reasoning, and Religion in Mesopotamia, Elam, and Greece, Jean Bottéro, Clarisse Herrenschmidt, and Jean-Pierre Vernant, with foreword by François Zabbal, translated by Teresa Lavender Fagan. University of Chicago Press, 2000. .
The Oldest Cuisine in the World: Cooking in Mesopotamia, Jean Bottéro, translated by Teresa Lavender Fagan. U of Chicago Press, 2004.  .
Everyday Life in Ancient Mesopotamia, Jean Bottéro, André Finet, Bertrand Lafont, Georges Roux, translated by Antonia Nevill. JHU Press, 2001. .
Religion in Ancient Mesopotamia, Jean Bottéro, translated by Teresa Lavender Fagan. U of Chicago Press, 2001. 
Birth of God: The Bible and the Historian, Jean Bottéro, translated by Kees W. Bolle. Penn State Press, 2010. .

References

External links 
 Jean Bottero on data.bnf.fr
 Obituary in Le Monde 
 Awilum.com » In Memoriam, Jean Bottéro 1914-2007

People from Alpes-Maritimes
1914 births
2007 deaths
French Assyriologists
Academic staff of the École pratique des hautes études
20th-century French historians
French historians of religion
French biblical scholars
French Dominicans
Prix Roger Caillois recipients
Assyriologists